WCHE (1520 AM, "WCHE 1520AM") is a commercial AM radio station licensed to serve West Chester, Pennsylvania. The station is owned by Jay Shur through licensee Chester County Radio, Inc. and airs a Talk radio format.

History
Purchased in 1997 by Jay and David Shur, WCHE is licensed as a daytimer AM, permitted to transmit from sunrise to sunset. This requires the station to be off the air during the nighttime hours because it interferes with the same frequency as clear-channel station WWKB in Buffalo, New York.

Translator
WCHE programming is simulcast on the following translator:

References

External links
 Official Website

CHE
West Chester, Pennsylvania
Radio stations established in 1963
1963 establishments in Pennsylvania
CHE